Sevalal Maharaj (15 February 1739 – 4 January 1773) was an Indian socio-religious reformer, community leader, and is now revered by the Kshatriyas Gor Banjara community as a spiritual guru. Gor Banjara community is a forest-dwelling and  warriors and adventurer, community, whose belief system and culture practices evolved in consonance with nature. They have symbiotic relationship with the nature (forest & wildlife) while having distinguished culture and language. Nevertheless, the modern colonial and post-colonial states have been encroaching their space and alienating their culture, language and their roots with nature. They have been struggling to protect their community identity, language, community landscape and their socio-political rights. Sri Sevalal played a key role in fighting for Kshatriyas Banjaras identity, language and right over forest and their traditional landscape in central and southern India (Deccan land). He fought with the Nizam ruler, the Mysuru ruler, and  also negotiated with the British rulers in the 18th century. He was a disciple of Jagadamba and was celibate throughout his life.
Sri Sevalal Maharaj, for the first time, provided sense of protection to the community. Sri Sevalal gave spiritual and enlightened direction to the community. He championed Banjara/Lambada/Goar community' political rights and indigenous rights over the traditional landscape while fighting with the Nizam, the Mysore and Colonial rules. He blended spirituality and politics to get political and socio-cultural rights and to reform the community, so that he could provide sense identity protection to community while reforming the Banjara community. Millions of Gor Banjara/Lambada consider him as a legend, hero and spiritual Guru of the community. He attained the status of God among the Banjaras. 

Sevalal Maharaj died at Ruhigarh (Yavatmal District) and was buried at Poharagarh in Washim district, now in the state of Maharashtra. His samadhi still stands there, adjacent to a temple dedicated to goddess Jagadamba. Although he was opposed to personality cults and rituals, it is a popular destination for Banjaras at Hindu festivals such as Diwali. Similar adjacent temples dedicated to Sevalal and to Jagdamba exist elsewhere and also attract worshipers in significant numbers. 

Every Banjara village/tanda has red/saffron and white flag that symbolises the Sri Sevalal'e victory and identity recognition.

Philosophical principals
He stated 22 major principles for Banjara life, known as the Seva Bollies:

Protect the forest and the environment
Live the natural life in consonance with nature
Do not practice discrimination toward anyone and any form
Live a life with the dignity
Do not lie, be honest (sat Boli), and do not steal others belongings 
Do not talk ill of others and do not harm others
Respect women, and girls are living goddesses 
Do not worry and live fearless, be courageous and confident in life 
Shade the greediness and material as well as sensual comforts
Protect the water, and provide water to the thirsty and also never involve in selling water, which is biggest crime/sin
Provide food to hungry and help the needy people
Respect elders and love youngers, and also respect animals 
Never leave the forest and Do not destroy the forest, if you destroy the forest then you are destroying yourself
Do not consume toxic substances and completely avoid drinking alcohol or any intoxication 
Do not involve in illicit relationship
Meditate to have inner peace, and study, seek knowledge and gain the Knowledge
Do not be lured by modern life style and comfort, and must engage with physical activity
Love humanity and not money, and have comradeship with fellow community persons
Have reasoned life and avoid all superstitious beliefs 
Respect you parents, take care of your family and the community,  and never break the brotherhood in the community
Protect the culture and language of the community, speak Gor Bhasa/Gorboli and also celebrate all the community's festivals, which are connected with the nature, and avoid those festivals which causes harm to nature
Should follow the community norms and maintain identity of the Gor/Banjara, be connected with nature and do not exploit it

Sevalal Maharaj have been a man of exemplary truthfulness, courage, concerned, humanitarian, disciplined, meditative, a great musician, a rationalist who fought against superstition, and a benighted devotee of Sheetala and Sati Devi includes Jagadamba.

The colonial British administrators also quote his stories, but they place him in the 18th century and identify his original name as Siva Rathod.

Folk songs (Banjara Geet)
There are folk songs praising Sevalal that are popular during Banjara festivities.

References

Further reading

1739 births
1806 deaths